James H. "Sloppy" Floyd (1920–1974) was a Democratic Georgia State Representative from 1953 to 1974.

Early life
Floyd attended Middle Georgia Junior College before enlisting in the United States Army Air Forces and serving in the Pacific Theatre during World War II.

Political career
Floyd served in the Georgia State House from 1953 until his death in 1974. He served as chairman of the Georgia House Appropriations Committee.

James H. Floyd State Park is named for him.

The James H. "Sloppy" Floyd Veterans Memorial Building is also named for him.

Bond v. Floyd 
Floyd was involved in the 1966 U.S. Supreme Court case Bond v. Floyd regarding the State House's refusal to seat Civil rights movement leader Julian Bond, one of 11 Black candidates to win House seats after the Voting Rights Act of 1965 forced redistricting, because of comments that Bond had made regarding the Vietnam War. Bond won the case and was required to be seated in the House.

References

External links

1920 births
1974 deaths
Democratic Party members of the Georgia House of Representatives
20th-century American politicians
United States Army Air Forces personnel of World War II